Shams Mulani (born 13 March 1997) is an Indian cricketer. He made his Twenty20 debut for Mumbai in the 2017–18 Zonal T20 League on 11 January 2018. He made his List A debut for Mumbai in the 2017–18 Vijay Hazare Trophy on 5 February 2018.

In October 2018, he was named in India A's squad for the 2018–19 Deodhar Trophy. In December 2018, he was named in India's team for the 2018 ACC Emerging Teams Asia Cup. In December 2019, in the opening round of the 2019–20 Ranji Trophy, he took his first five-wicket haul in first-class cricket.

References

External links
 

1997 births
Living people
Indian cricketers
Mumbai cricketers
Place of birth missing (living people)